Stanislas Robin (born October 21, 1990) is a French rugby league footballer who plays as a  or  for Limoux Grizzlies in the Elite One Championship.

He previously played for the Catalans Dragons, Sheffield Eagles and Toulouse Olympique.

Club career

Villeneuve XIII RLLG
Robin began his career at Villeneuve Leopards. In 2011 he spent some time in the junior teams at Wakefield Trinity.

Catalans Dragons
Robin joined Catalans Dragons in 2012, playing initially for the reserve team St Esteve. He made his Super League début for the club in 2015.

Sheffield Eagles
In June 2016 he joined Sheffield Eagles on loan. In September 2016 it was confirmed that he would be joining Toulouse Olympique from 2017.

Villeneuve XIII RLLG (rejoin)
On 18 July 2020 it was reported that he had re-signed for Villeneuve XIII RLLG in the Elite One Championship

International career
Robin made his début for France in October 2015, scoring a try in a victory over Ireland. Robin would go on to make two more tournament appearances, scoring one more try in the process. Robin was also a part of France's mid-tournament test match against England. He played in the 2016 end of year test match against England in Avignon.

References

External links
Toulouse Olympique profile
France profile

1990 births
Living people
Catalans Dragons players
France national rugby league team players
French rugby league players
Limoux Grizzlies players
Rugby league halfbacks
Sheffield Eagles players
Toulouse Olympique players
Villeneuve Leopards players